The 2012 Porsche Carrera Cup Italia season was the sixth Porsche Carrera Cup Italy season. It began on 5 May in Vallelunga and finished on 21 October in Monza. Vito Postiglione won the championship driving for Ebimotors, which won the teams' championship.

Teams and drivers

Race calendar and results

Championship standings

Drivers' Championship

† — Drivers did not finish the race, but were classified as they completed over 75% of the race distance.

Teams' Championship

† — Drivers did not finish the race, but were classified as they completed over 75% of the race distance.

Michelin Cup
The Michelin Cup is the trophy reserved to the gentlemen drivers.

Porsche Carrera Cup Italia Scholarship Programme
The Scholarship Programme Cup is the trophy reserved to the under-26 drivers elected by Porsche at the beginning of the season.

External links
 

Porsche Carrera Cup Italy seasons
Porsche Carrera Cup Italy